Debora Cahn is an American writer and producer of television and film. She was a writer and executive producer on the Showtime series Homeland for its final two seasons (2018–2020). She was also a writer and consulting producer on FX's Fosse/Verdon (2019), for which she won a Writers Guild of America award for Best Adapted Long Form Television. In 2018, she wrote the HBO film Paterno, starring Al Pacino and directed by Barry Levinson. She was a writer and co-executive producer for Martin Scorsese's HBO series Vinyl (2016). From 2006 to 2013, she was a writer and producer of Grey’s Anatomy. She began her career as a writer and producer on The West Wing from its fourth to seventh and final season (2002–2006). More recently, Cahn signed a multi-year overall deal with Netflix. Under the deal, she will serve as executive producer and showrunner on the political thriller drama series The Diplomat.

Cahn has won two Writers Guild of America Awards and has received multiple nominations.

Biography
Cahn graduated from Barnard College of Columbia University and received a master's degree in acting from the Institute for Advanced Theater Training at Harvard University. In 2006, Cahn married Michael Heller.

Awards and nominations 
In 2020, Cahn won the Writers Guild of America Award for Best Adapted Long Form Television for Fosse/Verdon. In 2006 and 2007, Cahn was part of the writing staff for two television series' nominated for the Primetime Emmy Award for Outstanding Drama Series and the Writers Guild of America Award for Television: Dramatic Series; The West Wing in 2006 and Grey's Anatomy in 2007. In 2005, Cahn won the Writers Guild of America Award for Television: Episodic Drama for the fifth-season episode "The Supremes".

Episodes written
Homeland
"Two Minutes" 
"Deception Indicated"
"Useful Idiot"
"Active Measures"
"Enemy of the State
Fosse/Verdon
"Me and My Baby"
Vinyl
"Rock and Roll Queen"
"The Racket"
"Whispered Secrets"
The West Wing
"College Kids" (story, with Mark Goffman)
"Red Haven's on Fire" (story, with Mark Goffman)
"Privateers" (teleplay and story, with Paul Redford and Aaron Sorkin)
"Jefferson Lives" (story, with Carol Flint)
"Abu el Banat"
"The Supremes"
"No Exit" (teleplay, with Carol Flint)
"Liftoff"
"Impact Winter"
"Drought Conditions"
"The Ticket"
"Undecideds"
"The Cold" (teleplay and story, with Lauren Schmidt)
"Requiem" (with John Wells and Eli Attie)
"Institutional Memory"
Grey's Anatomy
"Sometimes a Fantasy"
"Scars and Souvenirs"
"Love/Addiction"
"Losing My Mind"
"Brave New World"
"Wish You Were Here"
"Now or Never"
"Blink"
"Push"
"Not Responsible"
"Unaccompanied Minor"
"She's Gone"
"Dark Was the Night"
"Run, Baby, Run"
"She's Killing Me"
"I Want You With Me"
"Somebody That I Used To Know"
Private Practice
"To Change the Things I Can"
"Ex-Life" (with Jon Cowan, Robert Rovner and Krista Vernoff)
"The End of a Beautiful Friendship

References

External links

American television producers
American women television producers
American television writers
Jewish American screenwriters
Living people
American women television writers
Writers Guild of America Award winners
Place of birth missing (living people)
Year of birth missing (living people)
Institute for Advanced Theater Training, Harvard University alumni
Barnard College alumni
21st-century American Jews
21st-century American women writers
21st-century American screenwriters
20th-century American Jews